Mnichovo Hradiště is a town in Mladá Boleslav District in the Central Bohemian Region of the Czech Republic. It has about 8,700 inhabitants. The town centre is well preserved and is protected by law as an urban monument zone.

Administrative parts
Villages of Dneboh, Dobrá Voda, Hněvousice, Hoškovice, Hradec, Kruhy, Lhotice, Olšina, Podolí, Sychrov and Veselá are administrative parts of Mnichovo Hradiště.

Geography
It lies in the Jičín Uplands. The town is situated on the left bank of the Jizera River, which forms the western municipal border. The streams Veselka and Nedbalka, tributaries of the Jizera, flows through the town.

History
The first written mention of Mnichovo Hradiště is from 1279. It was founded by monks from the nearby Cistercian monastery in Klášter Hradiště nad Jizerou. The town was named the same as the monastery, Hradiště (meaning "gord"). From the 19th century, the town is called Mnichovo Hradiště ("Monk's Gord").

Until 1918, Münchengrätz – Mnichovo Hradiště was part of the Austrian monarchy (Austria side after the compromise of 1867), in the district with the same name, one of the 94 Bezirkshauptmannschaften in Bohemia.

Demographics

Economy
In 2010 a factory producing cola-based drink Kofola was opened in Mnichovo Hradiště.

Transport
The D10 motorway runs next to the town.

Sights

The main landmark of the town is Mnichovo Hradiště Castle. The original Gothic fortress was rebuilt into a Renaissance residence in 1606 by Václav Budovec of Budov. In 1621, it was acquired by Albrecht von Wallenstein. His family, the Waldstein family, owned the castle until 1945. In 1945, it was confiscated by the state. Today the castle is still owned by the state and is open to the public. It is protected as a national cultural monument.

The castle is connected to the baroque complex of the Capuchin monastery from the 1690s, founded by the Waldsteins. The complex include the Church of the Holy Three Kings, the convent and the burial chapel of the Waldsteins. The remains of Albrecht von Wallenstein were moved from Jičín to the chapel in 1723.

Notable people
Leopold Kompert (1822–1886), Jewish writer
Jan Šverma (1901–1944), journalist, communist activist, resistance fighter
Jiří Tancibudek (1921–2004), Czech-Australian oboist

Twin towns – sister cities

Mnichovo Hradiště is twinned with:
 Chojnów, Poland
 Erzhausen, Germany
 Figline e Incisa Valdarno, Italy

Gallery

References

External links

Mnichovo Hradiště Castle

Cities and towns in the Czech Republic